Beltrán Dalay Cortés Carvajal (21 November 1908 – 11 June 1984) was a convicted Costa Rican murderer, mostly known for the murders of the physicians Ricardo Moreno Cañas and Carlos Echandi. He is one of the most famous former prisoners of San Lucas Island.

Family and early years 

Beltrán Cortés was born on November 12, 1908 as the youngest of 18 siblings to Rosendo Cortés Madrigal and Amelia Carvajal in Santa Bárbara, Heredia. By 1938 he was living with his mom and three sisters in Santa Bárbara. He finished the first levels of elementary school and then went on to work as a farmer, never getting married or having children. A door accidentally fell on him as a kid in Heredia's central market, which resulted in a head wound that left a permanent scar and a humerus fracture in his right arm that never aligned because it was not properly treated in time.

The surgeries by Dr. Moreno and Dr. Echandi 

In 1928, at the age of 20, he had surgery three times by doctors Moreno and Echandi; on June 1 both doctors surgically wired his right humerus and then he had two follow up surgeries, on July 23 by Dr. Echandi and on August 3 by Dr. Moreno. On August 2, 1929, Dr. Moreno gave him metal plate implants, yet these were extracted on April 4, 1932. At this point his diagnosis was an unconsolidated humerus due to syphilis.

Criminal background 

After the surgeries he served as a police officer in San Rafael de Heredia.  On July 28, 1934, he killed his partner Benjamín Garita Ramírez while on duty. He was convicted to a 5-year sentence in San Lucas Island, however he got years taken off his sentence by performing manual labour. When he left prison he got a job at Chapuí Asylum, which he quickly quit to sell merchandise in the streets.

The doctors' murders 

Cortés became obsessed with the failed surgeries over time. At least one doctor told him they had been the surgeons' fault, while an attorney convinced him Dr. Moreno should compensate him for the hardship and pain suffered. Cortés later stated that he had gone to the hospital to get treated for a pain in his leg, and that Dr. Moreno took advantage of this to take a graft of bone from his healthy arm for a foreign patient. Prior to the murders, he had threatened killing the two doctors, leading his mother to ask that he be admitted into Chapuí Asylum. Cortés bought a gun from a police officer and on August 23, 1938 at 7:30 p.m he knocked on Dr. Moreno's door. When the maid opened the door he ran into the living room where Dr. Moreno was reading the newspaper and shot him three times. He escaped the scene and immediately went to Dr. Echandi's house, stopping along the way to ask for directions. When he got there he once again knocked on the door and was received by the footman. Dr. Echandi was on his way out, as he had heard on the radio the news of Dr. Moreno's death and wanted to go to the crime scene. Cortés shot him twice from the front gate, although only one of the shots hit him and the other one bounced off the door. During his escape Cortés also killed a Canadian man called Arthur Maynard, and severely injured two people by the names of Egérico Vargas Loría and Rodolfo Quirós Quirós, before being apprehended.

San Lucas Island 

On June 23, 1938 he was convicted to a sentence of undefined length at San Lucas Island. President León Cortés Castro ordered the construction of a two square metre cell for him that would allow visitors to see him. During several years tourists were brought from Puntarenas up to the island to see him exhibited in this cell.  José León Sánchez mentioned him in his book La isla de los hombres solos. President Otilio Ulate Blanco ordered that he be taken out of that cell and placed with the other prisoners during a visit to the facility. During President José Figueres' administration the country's penal code was reformed limiting Costa Rica's maximum penalty to 30 years in prison. Since Cortés had already being incarcerated for 32 years at this point he was immediately released. He died of prostate cancer on June 11, 1984 at the age of 75 in his sister's house in Santa Bárbara.

References

External links 
 Muere un hombre, nace un mito, Historia Visual de Costa Rica, La Nación.com. Consultado el 20 de agosto de 2008.
 Dr. Ricardo Moreno Cañas (en inglés), Infocostarica Staff. Consultado el 20 de agosto de 2008.

1908 births
1934 crimes in Costa Rica
1934 murders in North America
1938 crimes in Costa Rica
1938 murders in North America
1984 deaths
1930s murders in Costa Rica
Deaths from cancer in Costa Rica
Deaths from prostate cancer
Costa Rican people convicted of murder
Costa Rican people of Spanish descent
Costa Rican police officers
Costa Rican prisoners and detainees
Costa Rican serial killers
Male serial killers
People convicted of murder by Costa Rica
People from Santa Bárbara (canton)
Serial killers who worked in law enforcement